Bayfront Park is a  public, urban park in Downtown Miami, Florida on Biscayne Bay. The Chairman to the trust is Ary Shaeban. Located in the park is a bronze statue of Christopher Columbus sculpted by Count Vittorio di Colbertaldo of Verona, one of Benito Mussolini’s hand picked ceremonial bodyguards known as the “Black Musketeers.”

History

The park began construction in 1924 under the design plans of Warren Henry Manning and officially opened in March 1925.  Beginning in 1980, it underwent a major redesign by Japanese-American modernist artist and landscape architect, Isamu Noguchi.  Today, Bayfront Park is maintained by the Bayfront Park Management Trust, a limited agency of the city of Miami, Florida.

Bayfront Park is bordered on the north by Bayside Marketplace and the FTX Arena, on the south by Chopin Plaza, on the west by Biscayne Boulevard and on the east by Biscayne Bay. Bayfront Park is host to many large events such as the New Year's ball drop, Christmas celebrations, concerts, the Bayfront Park Amphitheater, the Tina Hills Pavilion, as well as boat tours around Biscayne Bay.

Seven blocks north is Bayfront Park's partner park, the  Bicentennial Park. This park’s name has been changed to Museum Park and it is home to The Perez Art Museum and the Frost Science Museum.

In June 2020, the park's Ponce de Leon and Christopher Columbus statues were vandalized, though it was announced that they would not be removed.

Site of assassination of Anton Cermak

On February 15, 1933, Chicago Mayor Anton Cermak was shot three times in the chest and mortally wounded while shaking hands with President-elect Franklin D. Roosevelt in front of Bayfront Park by assassin Giuseppe Zangara. Along with Cermak, who died of his wounds 19 days later, four other people were hit by the gunman, one of whom also died. A serious debate has ensued as to whether Zangara had been actually trying to assassinate Cermak, presumed to have been killed by accident, instead of Roosevelt, however no firm evidence has been found out to prove this theory.

Columbus Statue 

A bronze statue of Christopher Columbus was placed in the park in 1952, donated by the city's Italian-American community. The statue itself was sculpted by Count Vittorio di Colbertaldo of Verona, one of Benito Mussolini’s hand picked ceremonial bodyguards known as the “Black Musketeers.” Colbertaldo doubled as the Musketeers's sculptor, producing statues which commemorated the organization. On June 10, 2020 the Columbus statue at Bayfront Park was spray-painted with red paint, symbolizing spilt blood, as an act of protest against the continued glorification of a man responsible for ushering in an era of exploitation and slaughter of Indigenous peoples by European colonizers. The action was carried out by individuals protesting the murder of George Floyd and police brutality.

A second Columbus statue, by Colbertaldo, was installed at Coit Tower in Pioneer Park in San Francisco, in 1957, and removed in June, 2020.

Challenger Memorial 

The Challenger Memorial is a monument located on Southwest corner of Bayfront Park dedicated to the crew of the Space Shuttle Challenger, which exploded shortly after takeoff on January 28, 1986. The memorial was created by the Japanese-American artist Isamu Noguchi, and was dedicated on the second anniversary of the disaster, January 28, 1988. The 100 feet tall spiraling steel sculpture is shaped as a towering double-helix.

The triangle shaped plaque at the base, made of granite, has the following engraved poem by Michael McClure inscribed, as well as the last names of the crew who died:

O

Ivory

Cinder

Open Petals

Soar the Space Path,

Flesh Spirits, Heroes

McAuliffe Onizuka Jarvis

McNair Smith Resnik Scobee

Events
Bayfront Park holds the city's annual "America's Birthday Bash" on Independence Day, which attracted over 60,000 visitors in 2011. The park also hosts the city's official New Year's Eve party that annually hosts over 70,000 visitors. Visitors are encouraged to take public transport for events at Bayfront Park as parking can be scarce and expensive. The nearest Metrorail station is Government Center. From there a connection to the Metromover is available with three stops near the park, Bayfront Park, First Street, and College/Bayside.

It has been the site of the Ultra Music Festival, an electronic dance music event. In 2018, Miami's commissioners barred the festival from being held downtown, citing complaints surrounding noise and the behavior of attendees, resulting in a relocation to Virginia Key. The festival will return to the park in March 2022.

The park hosted the hip-hop music festival Rolling Loud in 2017. Performers included Kendrick Lamar, Future, Lil Wayne, ASAP Rocky, Travis Scott, Young Thug, and Mac Miller.

The Bayfront Park includes an amphitheater with capacity of 10,000 people, in where several cultural events have been held. On pop culture, notably, the Bayfront Park amphitheater was stage for country pop singer Shania Twain during her Come On Over Tour in early 1999, with two shows featuring guests Backstreet Boys, Elton John and Canadian dance group Leahy. A CBS television special was filmed throughout the concerts, and aired in March 1999 under the title of Winter Break. It was later released on home video in 2001 as The Specials.

Notable people

Caesar LaMonaca, composer and band leader

Facilities
The FPL Solar Amphitheater has a seating capacity of 10,000 people: 2,672 fixed benches and 7,328 in the lawn.
The Tina Hills Pavilion is an open-air pavilion with a seating capacity of 1,000 people: 200 fixed seats and 800 in the lawn.

Auto racing
A series of motorsports events took place on the temporary street circuit at Bayfront Park between 2002 and 2003.

For the Champ Car race from 2002-2003, see Grand Prix of Miami (Indycar)
For the ALMS race from 2002-2003, see Grand Prix of Miami (sports car racing)

Lap Records
The official race lap records at Bayfront Park (Miami) are listed as:

References

External links

1924 establishments in Florida
Urban public parks
Geography of Miami
IMSA GT Championship circuits
American Le Mans Series circuits
Champ Car circuits
Motorsport venues in Florida
Defunct motorsport venues in the United States
Parks in Miami